Arsilda, regina di Ponto is a dramma per musica by Antonio Vivaldi. The opera was first performed at the Teatro Sant'Angelo in Venice on 27 or 28 October 1716.

Roles

Plot
The plot was considered rather controversial at the time and led originally to censorship of the opera. It involves the title character falling in love with another woman dressed as a man.

Recordings

Conductor: Federico Maria Sardelli. Orchestra: Modo Antiquo, Coro da Camera Italiano. Singers: Simonetta Cavalli, Lucia Sciannimanico, Elena Cecchi Fedi, Nicky Kennedy, Joseph Cornwell, Sergio Foresti, Alessandra Rossi. Date: 15–24 July 2001. Issued: 2004. Label: CPO 999 740-2

References

1716 operas
Operas by Antonio Vivaldi
Opera seria
Italian-language operas
Operas